The Stolen Paradise is a 1917 American silent drama film directed by Harley Knoles and starring Ethel Clayton, Edward Langford and Pinna Nesbit. Prints and/or fragments were found in the Dawson Film Find in 1978.

Cast
 Ethel Clayton as Joan Merrifield 
 Edward Langford as David Clifton 
 Pinna Nesbit as Katharine Lambert 
 George MacQuarrie as Kenneth Brooks 
 Robert Forsyth as Doctor Crawley
 George Cowl as Basil Cairns
 Lew Hart as Jonathan Merrifield
 Edward Reed as Marquette
 Edwin Roe as Doctor Martin
 Ivan Dobble as Jacques Rigard

References

Bibliography
 Cari Beauchamp. Without Lying Down: Frances Marion and the Powerful Women of Early Hollywood. University of California Press, 1998.

External links
 

1917 films
1917 drama films
1910s English-language films
American silent feature films
Silent American drama films
Films directed by Harley Knoles
American black-and-white films
World Film Company films
1910s American films